FabricLive.11 is a DJ mix compilation album by Bent, as part of the FabricLive Mix Series.

Track listing
  Intro 0:45
  Giorgio Moroder - From Here To Eternity - Universal 5:05
  Metro Area - Caught Up - Environ 3:06
  I:Cube - Tunnel Vision - Versatile 5:29
  Black Lodge - Horse With No Name - Mo' Wax 3:43
  Kelley Polar Quartet - Hammer/Anvil - Environ 5:26
  Nile - To Sir With Love (Chicken Lips Full Length Vocal Mix) - Independiente 3:51
  Morgan Geist - 24k - Environ 5:41
  Tim 'Love' Lee - Touch It - Tummy Touch 4:10
  Whodini - Magic's Wand - Zomba 4:45
  Fila Brazillia - The New Cannonball - Twentythree 2:55
  Mr. Scruff - Shrimp - Ninja Tune 4:19
  Jollymusic - Radio Jolly - Sony 3:24
  Annie - The Greatest Hit - Loaded 3:45
  Bent - Magic Love - Ministry Of Sound 3:43
  Jean Carn - That Was All It Was - Demon 3:41
  Steve Arrington - Dancin' in the Key of Life - Warner 5:14

External links
Fabric: FabricLive.11

Bent (band) compilation albums
2003 compilation albums